Chile competed at the 2017 World Championships in Athletics in London, United Kingdom, from 4 to 13 August 2017.

Consisting of nine athletes (six men and three women), the Chilean delegation was the largest in the history of the competition.

Results

Men
Track and road events

Women
Track and road events

Field events

Sources

Nations at the 2017 World Championships in Athletics
World Championships in Athletics
Chile at the World Championships in Athletics